Girls Planet 999: The Girls Saga (simply referred to as Girls Planet 999) was a South Korean reality competition show created by Mnet. It premiered on August 6, 2021 and was originally broadcast every Friday at 8:20 PM KST for the first eleven episodes until its finale on October 22, which was broadcast live at 8 PM KST. It was aired on the Mnet channel, IQIYI, AbemaTV, tvN Asia or YouTube depending on the viewer's region.

A production by Mnet's parent company CJ E&M and its subsidiary Studio Take One, as well as in collaboration with game developer and publisher NCSoft, the aim of the competition was to debut a new 9-member K-pop girl group consisting of trainees and idols from China, Japan, and South Korea. Auditions for the competition were held from January to February 2021.

Out of 13,000 applicants, 99 final contestants were selected. These 99 contestants were split equally into three groups; the -Group, -Group and the -Group. 

In the finale on October 22, 2021, which was broadcast live, the show announced the final 9 members who would debut as Kep1er.

A second season named Boys Planet would premiere on February 2, 2023 featuring male trainees and idols.

Concept and format
The "planet" theme of the show was derived from a new collaboration between Mnet and NCSoft's new platform called Universe which is centered around K-pop. It allowed votes from other countries outside of the participating three, and also hosted other promotional content for the show.

The show initially grouped the girls into groups of 3 which were called "cells." An entire cell of girls could be eliminated all at once, hence increasing the risk of elimination. To counteract this, the "Planet Top 9" is introduced. Contestants who are selected or voted to be the Planet Top 9 (designated P1 to P9) can reorganize cells to try and lower the chances of elimination. Cells were disbanded after the first elimination round. At the end of the competition, the top 9 most-voted contestants debuted regardless of nationality.

Promotion and broadcast
The show, as well as its auditions, was first announced on January 11, 2021, through Mnet. Yeo Jin-goo was announced as the show's presenter on June 8, followed by the reveal of the mentors and the name of the show's opening theme later that same month. More promotional clips from the show were broadcast that month on Mnet.

The show's premiere date of August 6, 2021, was confirmed through a teaser video released on July 6, 2021. Another teaser video showcasing the faces of the 99 contestants was released on July 8, along with a promotional poster.

The theme song, “O.O.O (Over&Over&Over),” was released on July 12, 2021, accompanied by a performance by the Korean group with Kim Dayeon as Center. Another version of the performance featuring the Chinese group was released on July 14 with Shen Xiaoting as Center. The Japanese group's version was released on July 16 with Hikaru Ezaki as Center. The full version containing all three groups was released on July 29 during M Countdown, preceded by the contestants' profiles which were released from July 17 to 19 at 10 AM KST for each group. More teasers were released in July and August 2021 leading up to the show's premiere.

The show was available through Mnet in South Korea, iQIYI internationally, AbemaTV and Mnet Japan in Japan, tvN Asia in Southeast Asia, and YouTube in the rest of the world through Mnet's YouTube channel, Mnet K-POP.

Cast
The series was presented by Yeo Jin-goo, dubbed as the "Planet Master." The rest of the mentors, also dubbed as "masters," were:
K-Pop Masters:
Lee Sun-mi
Tiffany Young
Dance Masters:
Baek Koo-young
Jang Juhee
Vocal Masters:
Lim Han-byul
Jo A-young
Rap Master (Episodes 6–7):
Woo Won-jae

Contestants

There was a total of 99 contestants participating in the competition. 33 were Korean, and 33 consisted of Chinese, Taiwanese and Hongkongers, and the last 33 were Japanese.

The English names of K-Group and C-Group contestants are presented in Eastern order in accordance with the official website while J-Group contestants' names are presented in Western order.

Color key (In order of contestant's group rank on the show)

Ranking

Planet Top 9
The Planet Top 9 was either selected by the mentors (Episode 2) or voted by viewers of the show; those selected to be the Planet Top 9 in Episode 2 were given the ability to reshuffle and organize cells.

Color key:

Planet Pass
Planet Pass was a vote by the mentors, in which eliminated contestants could be brought back to the show.

The first two elimination rounds included a Planet Pass for one eliminated contestant from each group. The third elimination round included only one Planet Pass which could go to any eliminated contestant regardless of group.

First voting period
The first voting period took place from August 13, 2021 to August 28, 2021.

Voters (viewers and mentors) voted for three cells, as well as three girls of each group.

Eliminations were based on cell points, while the Planet Top 9 was based on individual points.

Color key:

Second voting period
The second voting period took place from September 3, 2021 to September 18, 2021.

Voters voted for three contestants of each group.

Eliminations were based on individual points within K-Group, C-Group and J-Group.

Color key:

Third voting period 
The third voting period took place from September 24, 2021 to October 9, 2021. Voters could only vote for one contestant from each group.

Eliminations were based on individual votes regardless of group.

Fourth voting period 
The first round of the fourth voting period took from October 15, 2021 until 10AM KST on October 22, 2021.

The second round was open during the finale live broadcast on October 22, 2021; all live votes were doubled.

Voters could only vote for one contestant out of the eighteen remaining.

The members of the debut lineup were decided based on individual votes regardless of group.

Result

The finale was held and broadcast live on October 22, 2021. Yeo Jin-goo announced the newly formed girl group name to be Kep1er.

Episodes

Discography

Extended plays

Singles

Ratings

Aftermath
Kep1er was supposed to debut on December 14, 2021 with the mini album First Impact, but due to one of their staff members testing positive for COVID-19, their debut was delayed to January 3, 2022. The group's debut performance at the 2021 Mnet Asian Music Awards on December 11 was also cancelled as a result, as well as some members testing positive for COVID-19. The group officially debuted on January 3, 2022. 

Some contestants returned to their original groups:
Ma Yuling (C24) and Wang Qiuru (C32) returned to SNH48.
Liang Jiao (C10) and Liang Qiao (C20) returned to GNZ48.
Su Ruiqi (P13) returned to Chic Chili.
Wen Zhe (P17) returned to Hickey.
Sim Seungeun (K21) returned to Bvndit and joined group promotions for their third mini album, Re-Original, in May 2022. Bvndit disbanded on November 11, 2022 after all the members terminated all their contracts with MNH.
Lee Rayeon (K23), Chiayi (C16) and Kim Doah (K10) returned to Fanatics.
Huh Jiwon (K16), May (P23) and Kim Bora (P15) returned to Cherry Bullet and rejoined group promotions for their second mini album, Cherry Wish, in March 2022.
 Some trainees left their agencies/joined new agencies:
Chang Ching (C23) and Lee Yunji (K26) left Yuehua Entertainment and Cube Entertainment respectively. Later, they signed with FC ENM, the same agency of contestants Ririka Kishida (P22) and Hana Hayase (J18).
Ruan Ikema (P19) and Hina Terasaki (J28) signed with KISS Entertainment.
Jeong Jiyoon (K12) signed with KM Entertainment. 
You Dayeon (K19) left Highline Entertainment. 
Han Dana (K33) signed a contract with Beats Entertainment. 
Miyu Ito (J19) signed a contract with 143 Entertainment, the company that manages Kep1er members Kang Yeseo (P6) and Mashiro Sakamoto (P8). 
Li Yiman (C11) signed a contract with FLEX M. 
Shihona Sakamoto (J14) left Jellyfish Entertainment. 
Kim Yeeun (K25) left Fantagio Music. 
Choi Hyerin (K27) left MNH Entertainment. 
Chien Tzuling (C27) left Yuehua Entertainment. 
Kim Hyerim (K15) signed with Doubling Music. 
Xia Yan (C19) joined Real Show Culture Company. 
Lee Yeongyung (K22) joined Come & Funny Corporation. 
Risako Arai (J15) and Yume Murakami (J24) left Biscuit Entertainment. Then, Risako signed with iME Korea
 Kotone Kamimoto (P24) joined Modhaus. 
An Jeongmin (K13) left TOP Media. 
Sim Seungeun left MNH Entertainment. 
Lee Sun-woo left Evermore Music.
Some contestants debuted in new groups or debuted as soloists:
Kim Suyeon (P10) debuted as a new member of Mystic Story's girl group, Billlie, under the stage name "Sheon". She debuted on November 27, 2021. She had her first release with the group on December 14 with their first digital single album The Collective Soul and Unconscious: Snowy Night.
Su Ruiqi (P13) released her 8th digital single on December 14, 2021.
Fu Yaning (P12) released her second digital single titled Starlight on December 27, 2021. She also starred in the iQiYi dramas My Heart and The Flowers Are Blooming.
Ririka Kishida (P22), Hana Hayase (J18), Chang Ching (C23) and Lee Yunji (K26) debuted under FC Entertainment in a six-member group called ILY:1 on April 4, 2022. Lee Yunji and Chang Ching use the stage name "Ara" and "Rona" respectively while Ririka Kishida and Hana Hayase use their birth names.
Shana Nonaka (P16) debuted in MLD Entertainment's new girl group, Lapillus, with the single "Hit Ya!" on June 20, 2022.
Kim Hyerim (K15) debuted as a soloist on January 24, 2022.
Yurina Kawaguchi (P14) debuted as a soloist on March 21, 2022 with her first single Look At Me. 
Kim Bora (P15) starred in the web-drama Jinx. 
Huh Jiwon (K16) starred in the web-drama Heart Way. 
Wen Zhe (P17) debuted as an actress. 
Yoon Jia (K11) debuted in Yes Im Entertainment group MiMiiRose on September 16, 2022. 
Miyu Ito (J19) debuted in 143 Entertainment's group Limelight on September 29, 2022. 
Jeong Jiyoon (K12) joined Ichillin' and made her debut with the group on November 10, 2022.
Ruan Ikema (P19) and Manami Nagai (P20) will debut in Kiss Entertainment's Japan-based girl group Kiss Girl's.
Kotone Kamimoto (P24) was revealed as TripleS' eleventh member on January 2, 2023.
Some contestants are going to participate/partecipated in other survival shows:
Moana Yamauchi (J13) participated in the Japanese survival show iCON Z.  
Zhou Xinyu, Cui Wenmeixiu, Gu Yizhou, and Cai Bing participated in the Chinese survival show, "Great Dance Crew".  
Lee Sunwoo (K24) participated in Channel A's "Youth Star". 
 You Dayeon (K19) partecipated in Show Me the Money 11, but was eliminated in the first round.

Notes

References

External links

Girls Planet 999 on TVING
Girls Planet 999 on iQIYI

Girls Planet 999
Music competitions in South Korea
K-pop television series
Reality music competition television series
Mnet (TV channel) original programming
Korean-language television shows
South Korean music television shows
2021 South Korean television series debuts
2021 South Korean television series endings